Spaceman (stylized as SPACEMAN) is a 2018 mixtape by Octavian. It includes guest appearances from Krimbo, Suspect, Swift, and A2. The cover art was created by Virgil Abloh, Armin Druzanovic, and Michael Phan. Music videos were created for "Revenge", "Here Is Not Safe", and "Move Faster". The mixtape peaked at number 98 on the UK Albums Chart.

Critical reception

At Metacritic, which assigns a weighted average score out of 100 to reviews from mainstream critics, the mixtape received an average score of 81, based on 5 reviews, indicating "universal acclaim".

Accolades

Track listing

Charts

References

2018 mixtape albums
Octavian (rapper) albums
Black Butter Records albums